Okulovskaya is a rural locality (a village) in Pakshengskoye Rural Settlement of Velsky District, Arkhangelsk Oblast, Russia. The population was 5 as of 2014. There is 1 street.

Geography 
Okulovskaya is located 38 km north of Velsk (the district's administrative centre) by road. Petregino is the nearest rural locality.

References 

Rural localities in Velsky District